Penola is a genus of flies belonging to the family lesser dung flies. they are closely related to the genus Frutillaria from mainland South America

Species
Penola eudyptidis (Richards, 1941) Falkland Islands

References

Sphaeroceridae
Diptera of South America
Sphaeroceroidea genera
Fauna of the Falkland Islands